The Innocence Network is an affiliation of organizations dedicated to providing pro bono legal and investigative services to individuals seeking to prove innocence of crimes for which they have been convicted and working to redress the causes of wrongful convictions.
Most organizations involved are in the United States, covering all 50 states; however, the network includes organizations in Canada, Australia, and the UK.

In 2013, the work of Innocence Network member organizations led to the exoneration of 31 people imprisoned for crimes they did not commit.

Members
 Actual Innocence Clinic at the University of Texas School of Law
 After Innocence
 Alaska Innocence Project
 Arizona Justice Project
 California Innocence Project
 Center on Wrongful Convictions
 Committee for Public Counsel Services Innocence Program
 Connecticut Innocence Project/Post-conviction Unit
 Duke Center for Criminal Justice & Professional Responsibility
 Exoneration Initiative
 George C. Cochran Mississippi Innocence Project
 Georgia Innocence Project
 Griffith University Innocence Project
 Hawai'i Innocence Project
 Idaho Innocence Project
 Illinois Innocence Project
 Innocence & Justice Project at the University of New Mexico School of Law
 Innocence Project
 Innocence Project Argentina
 Innocence Project at UVA School of Law
 Innocence Project Brasil
Innocence Project London
 Innocence Project of Minnesota
 Innocence Project New Orleans
 Innocence Project New Zealand
 Innocence Project Northwest
 Innocence Project of Florida
 Innocence Project of Iowa
 Innocence Project of Texas
 Irish Innocence Project at Griffith College
 Italy Innocence Project
 Justicia Reinvindicada – Puerto Rico Innocence Project
 Kentucky Innocence Project
 Knoops' Innocence Project
 Life After Innocence
 Loyola Law School Project for the Innocent
 Michigan Innocence Clinic
 Michigan State Appellate Defender Office – Wrongful Conviction Units
 Mid-Atlantic Innocence Project
 Midwest Innocence Project
 Montana Innocence Project
 Nebraska Innocence Project
 New England Innocence Project
 New York Law School Post-Conviction Innocence Clinic
 North Carolina Center on Actual Innocence
 Northern California Innocence Project
 Office of the Ohio Public Defender, Wrongful Conviction Project
 Ohio Innocence Project
 Oklahoma Innocence Project
 Oregon Innocence Project
 Pennsylvania Innocence Project
 Reinvestigation Project
 Resurrection After Exoneration
 Rocky Mountain Innocence Center
 Sellenger Centre Criminal Justice Review Project
 Taiwan Association for Innocence
 The Association in Defence of the Wrongly Convicted (AIDWYC)
 The Israeli Public Defender
 Thurgood Marshall School of Law Innocence Project
 University of Baltimore Innocence Project Clinic
 University of British Columbia Innocence Project at the Allard School of Law
 University of Miami Law Innocence Clinic
 Wake Forest University Law School Innocence and Justice Clinic
 West Virginia Innocence Project
 Western Michigan University Cooley Law School Innocence Project
 Wisconsin Innocence Project
 Witness to Innocence
 Wrongful Conviction Clinic at Indiana University

References

External links 

Legal aid